Phenylpropiolic acid, C6H5CCCO2H, formed by the action of alcoholic potash on cinnamic acid dibromide, C6H5CHBrCHBrCO2H, crystallizes in long needles or prisms which melt at 136–137 °C. When heated with water to 120 °C, it yields phenylacetylene (C6H5CCH). Chromic acid oxidizes it to benzoic acid; zinc and acetic acid reduce it to cinnamic acid, C6H5CH=CHCO2H, whilst sodium amalgam reduces it to hydrocinnamic acid, C6H5CH2CH2CO2H. Ortho-nitrophenylpropiolic acid, NO2C6H4CCCO2H, prepared by the action of alcoholic potash on ortho-nitrocinnamic acid dibromide, crystallizes in needles which decompose when heated to 155–156 °C. It is readily converted into indigo.

References

Phenyl compounds
Alkyne derivatives
Carboxylic acids